San Sebastián Hospital is a 16th-century building on Calle Torrijos in Córdoba, Spain. It is situated in the historic centre, just opposite the west front of the Mosque–Cathedral of Córdoba. Founded in 1363 in Alcayceria, it was moved in the early 16th century. Built to a design by Hernán Ruiz, el Viejo, construction on the current building occurred during the period of 1512-16. The building served as a hospital (1516-1816); a home for mothers and infants (1816-1961); and currently houses the Palace of Congresses and Exhibitions, as well as the Office of Tourism.

References

Further reading
 Moral, Antonio García del (1984), El Hospital Mayor de San Sebastián de Córdoba: Cinco Siglos de Asistencia Médico-Sanitaria Institucional: 1363-1816

External links
 

1363 establishments in Europe
Buildings and structures completed in 1516
Hospital buildings completed in the 16th century
Historic centre of Córdoba, Spain
Buildings and structures in Córdoba, Spain
Defunct hospitals in Spain
1516 establishments in Spain
14th-century establishments in Castile